Kalubowila is a suburb in Colombo, Sri Lanka. It is inside the administration boundary of the Dehiwala-Mount Lavinia Municipal Council. The Colombo South Teaching Hospital is located here.

References

Populated places in Western Province, Sri Lanka